Tabar may refer to:

 The Punjabi word for "family"
 The Pashto word for "tribe" in the Pashtun tribal structure
 Tabbar, 2021 Indian television series
 Tabar (axe), a type of battle axe
 INS Tabar (F44), an Indian naval vessel
 Tabar, Iran, a village in North Khorasan Province, Iran
 Tabar, Isfahan, a village in Isfahan Province, Iran
 Tabar Rural District, in North Khorasan Province, Iran
 The Tabar Islands, AKA Tabar Group, an island group in Papua New Guinea
Tabar, Navarre, a village in Navarre, Spain, part of Urraúl Bajo Municipality

See also
 Tabara (disambiguation)
 Taber, Alberta, a town in southern Alberta, Canada
 Tabor (disambiguation)
 Tabaristan